R.I.S - Delitti Imperfetti (R.I.S - imperfect crimes) is an Italian television series, created in 2004 by Pietro Valsecchi, broadcast since January 2005 on Canale 5. The title, where RIS is an acronym for Reparto Investigazioni Scientifiche (an actual, real-life unit of the Carabinieri, the Italian gendarmerie), could be approximately translated into English as Unit of Scientific Investigations: Imperfect Crimes.  As the title indicates, the series is a crime drama, focusing on the scientific aspects of crime investigations, in a similar vein to the popular American TV series CSI: Crime Scene Investigation (though RIS is not a remake thereof).

Plot summary 
The Series follows the team of forensics who are trying to solve the case with help of evidence. Head of the R.I.S in first five seasons was Ricardo Venturi and in last three seasons Lucia Brancato. Location of the series is in Parma (seasons 1-5) and Rome (seasons 6-8). The change of location was made because Ghirelli (who has been in Parma in 4th and 5th season) and Flavia (who had been in Parma in 5th season) moved in Rome at the beginning of the 6th season.

Characters 
List of R.I.S Delitti Imperfetti characters
 Lorenzo Flaherty – Captain Riccardo Venturi, head of R.I.S (2005-2009)
 Euridice Axen - Captain Lucia Brancato, head of R.IS (2010-2012)
 Nicole Grimaudo – Lieutenant Anna Giordano (2005-2006)
 Micaela Ramazzotti – Sara Melli (2007)
 Giorgia Surina - Lieutenant Michela Riva (2008)
 Jun Ichickava – Sublieutenant Flavia Ayroldi (2009-2011)
 Simone Gandolfo – Lieutenant Orlando Serra (2011-2012)
 Filippo Nigro – Lieutenant/Captain Fabio Martinelli (2005-2007)
 Michele Venitucci - Lieutenant Giovanni Rinaldi (2008)
 Primo Reggiani – Sublieutenant Emiliano Cecchi (2010-2012)
 Stefano Pesce – Lieutenant Davide Testi (2005-2007)
 Fabio Troiano – Lieutenant/Captain Daniele Ghirelli (2008-2012)
 Ugo Dighero –  Marshal Vincenzo De Biase (2005-2009)
 Marco Rosetti – Lieutenant Bartolomeo Dossena (2010-2012)
 Giulia Michelini – Francesca de Biase (2005-2008)
 Magdalena Mochowska - Dr. Veronica Gambetta (2009)
 Mary Petruolo – Sublieutenant Constanza Moro (2010)
 Lucia Rossi – Sublieutenant Bianca Proetti (2011-2012)
 Gea Lionello – Dr. Claudia Morandi, ME (2005-2009)
 Giamperdo Judica – Captain Bruno Corsini, detective (2005)
 Paolo Maria Scalondro – Captain Edoardo Rocchi, detective (2006-2009)
 Claudio Castargiovanni – Captain Guido Brancato, detective (2010)
 Perluiggi Coralo – Captain Ernesto Rambaudi, detective (2010-2012)
 Nino D'Agata – General Giacomo Tosi, police general (2005-2007,2009)
 Romina Mondello – Lieutenant Giorgia Levi (2006-2009)
 Leonardo Treviglio – Luka Grassi (2006)

Episodes 
List of RIS Delitti Imperfetti episodes

Remakes 
The series has successfully spawned three remakes; a French R.I.S, police scientifique, German R. I. S. – Die Sprache der Toten and Spanish RIS Cientifica.

See also 
 R.I.S, police scientifique, the French remake
 R. I. S. – Die Sprache der Toten, the German remake
 RIS Cientifica, the Spanish remake

External links 
 Official Website
 

Italian crime television series
2005 Italian television series debuts
2000s Italian drama television series
2010s Italian drama television series
Canale 5 original programming